Copelatus restrictus is a species of diving beetle. It is part of the genus Copelatus in the subfamily Copelatinae of the family Dytiscidae. It was described by Sharp in 1882.

Its type locality is Montevideo.

References

Further reading

 

restrictus
Beetles described in 1882